Sarawanabavanandan Shanmuganathan (16 May 1960 – 15 July 1998; known as Vasanthan) was a Sri Lankan Tamil militant, politician and Member of Parliament.

Shanmuganathan was born on 16 May 1960. He was a Hindu. He was a senior member of the militant People's Liberation Organisation of Tamil Eelam, serving as its commander in Vavuniya.

Shanmuganathan was member of Vavuniya Urban Council. He contested the 1994 parliamentary election as one of the Democratic People's Liberation Front's candidates in Vanni District and was elected to Parliament.

Shanmuganathan was killed by a claymore mine in Irambaikkulam, Vavuniya District on 15 July 1998. The assassination was blamed on the rival rebel Liberation Tigers of Tamil Eelam. However, the pro-LTTE TamilNet claimed that Shanmuganathan had been the victim of an internal conflict within the PLOTE.

References

1960 births
1998 deaths
Democratic People's Liberation Front politicians
Local authority councillors of Sri Lanka
Members of the 10th Parliament of Sri Lanka
Assassinated Sri Lankan politicians
People from Northern Province, Sri Lanka
People killed during the Sri Lankan Civil War
People's Liberation Organisation of Tamil Eelam militants
Sri Lankan Hindus
Sri Lankan Tamil politicians
Sri Lankan Tamil rebels
Sri Lankan terrorism victims
Terrorism deaths in Sri Lanka